The Tarheel Forensic League is the speech and debate league for North Carolina.  It was created in 1976 and is made up of 44 schools.  League members compete in  the debate events of Lincoln-Douglas debate, Public Forum debate, and Congressional debate.  Speech events include Extemporaneous Speaking, Humorous Interpretation, Duo Interpretation, Dramatic Interpretation, Impromptu Speaking, Original Oratory, and Radio Announcing.

External links
 Official site
 East Chapel Hill S&D site
 Cary Academy S&D site
 Pinecrest High School S&D site
 Durham Academy S&D site
 Myers Park S&D site
 North Mecklenburg S&D site

Youth organizations based in the United States
Student debating societies